The Taming of the Shrewd is a 2022 Polish film directed by Anna Wieczur-Bluszcz and starring Piotr Cyrwus, Jan Kardasinski and Magdalena Lamparska.

Cast 
 Magdalena Lamparska
 Mikolaj Roznerski
 Piotr Cyrwus
 Tomasz Sapryk
 Jan Kardasinski
 Dorota Landowska
 Adam Malysz
 Piotr Polk
 Magdalena Schejbal
 Dorota Stalinska
 Elzbieta Trzaskos
 Mariusz Wach
 Slawomir Zapala

References

External links
 
 

2022 films
2020s Polish-language films
Polish-language Netflix original films